Adam Seymour Haywood (23 March 1875 – May 1932) was an English footballer who played as an inside-forward. Some sources spell his surname as Heywood or Hayward.

Biography 
Haywood was born in Horninglow, Burton upon Trent. He turned professional with Woolwich Arsenal in January 1896; he made his debut against Leicester Fosse on 25 January 1896 and was an ever-present for the rest of the 1895-96 season. He continued to play as a mainstay in the Arsenal side the following three seasons, scoring regularly as well (his best being 1898-99, when he scored 12 goals in 23 league games). In total he played 91 times for Arsenal, scoring 36 goals, but Arsenal's financial situation meant they were forced to accept a £50 bid from Glossop North End in May 1899.

Haywood spent just three months at Glossop before joining Queens Park Rangers in August 1899, becoming part of an experienced squad of ex-League players, including four ex-Arsenal colleagues. While at QPR, Haywood was part of the Rangers side who beat Wolverhampton Wanderers in 1900. Wolves were so impressed by Haywood's display over the two games that, within a year, via a short stay at New Brompton, he was signed by the First Division club, going on to make over a century of top-flight appearances.

May 1905 saw him transfer to West Bromwich Albion, where he was the club's top league scorer during 1905–06, finding the net 21 times. He remained at Albion for two-and-a-half years before signing for Blackpool.

He made his debut for Blackpool, in the number-8 shirt, on 30 November 1907, in a defeat at Derby County. He made twelve more League appearances for the club before the end of the 1907–08 season, his final one being in a defeat at Lincoln City, this time in the number-10 shirt. He scored one goal during his short career on the Fylde Coast – in a 2–1 Lancashire derby defeat at Burnley on Christmas Day. He also made one FA Cup appearance for Blackpool – in yet another defeat, this time at the hands of Manchester United at Old Trafford on New Year's Day, 1908.

He joined Crystal Palace as player-coach in May 1908, finally retiring from playing football in 1909.

Death 
Haywood died in May 1932.

References 
Specific

General
 
 
 Allfootballers.com: Complete League record
 Various newspaper match reports 1894-1908

1875 births
1932 deaths
Sportspeople from Burton upon Trent
English footballers
Association football inside forwards
Burton Wanderers F.C. players
Arsenal F.C. players
Glossop North End A.F.C. players
Queens Park Rangers F.C. players
Gillingham F.C. players
Wolverhampton Wanderers F.C. players
West Bromwich Albion F.C. players
Blackpool F.C. players
Crystal Palace F.C. players
English Football League players